Gideon's Sword is a novel by Douglas Preston and Lincoln Child. It was released on February 22, 2011 by Grand Central Publishing. The book is the first installment in the Gideon Crew series.

Plot summary
The story introduces Gideon Crew, a scientist at Los Alamos National Laboratory who is also a former art thief/master-of-disguise.  He learns from his mother that his mathematician father—who had developed a flawed encryption—had actually warned his boss about the flaws, only to be murdered. Gideon exacts revenge from his father's murderer. As a result of this, he is recruited to be a freelance operative by an ultra-private security/engineering firm working for the Department of Homeland Security. His mission: to trace and retrieve plans for a mysterious super-weapon being brought to the United States of America by a Chinese scientist before the Chinese can recover them.

Film adaptation
In May 2010, the novel will be produced by Michael Bay and Paramount Pictures and written by Chap Taylor.

References

External links
Official website

American thriller novels

Techno-thriller novels
Novels by Douglas Preston
Novels by Lincoln Child
2011 American novels
Grand Central Publishing books